Now on PBS is a Public Broadcasting Service newsmagazine that focused on social and political issues.

History
First airing in January 2002, and originally called Now with Bill Moyers, the program was launched as a collaboration between NPR news and Public Broadcasting Service (PBS). The program featured documentary reporting, interviews and commentary on current events. Bill Moyers served initially as sole host of the program while NPR reporters and commentators produced individual segments for the hour long-program.

In the autumn of 2003, David Brancaccio was introduced as a co-host. In 2004, Kenneth Tomlinson, the Chairman of the Corporation for Public Broadcasting, paid an outside consultant $14,000 to watch NOW with Bill Moyers and analyze the politics of the show. The study was not approved by the CPB. After the study became public in 2005, the CPB-funded NPR, among other organizations, criticized the resulting study as being full of errors and a waste of money.

In the summer of 2004 the Corporation for Public Broadcasting announced that it would no longer provide funding for Now. Moyers subsequently announced that he would leave the show after the 2004 U.S. elections and appeared for the last time on December 17, 2004. After his departure, the show was reduced to a half hour.

Maria Hinojosa was credited as a senior correspondent for the show while presenting many investigative pieces. She and Brancaccio became the only two presenters and usually alternated segments.

In November 2009 it was announced that the program had been canceled, and its last episode aired on April 30, 2010.

Awards
In 2008 Now was awarded the Edward R. Murrow Award, Overseas Press Club for a story on child brides. NOW on PBS was also awarded a National Business EmmyAward in 2007 and a National News Emmy Award for best newsmagazine segment in 2004.

References

External links
 
 NOW 2005
 NOW at TV Guide
 

2002 American television series debuts
2000s American television news shows
2010s American television news shows
2010 American television series endings
PBS original programming
Television series by WNET